The 1965 Penn State Nittany Lions football team represented Penn State University during the 1965 NCAA University Division football season. It was Rip Engle's last season as head coach of Penn State.

Schedule

References

Penn State
Penn State Nittany Lions football seasons
Penn State Nittany Lions football